Christian Frederiksen (born 31 January 1965) is a Danish-born, Norwegian sprint canoer and marathon canoeist who competed from the late 1980s to the early 2000s (decade). Competing in four Summer Olympics, he won a silver medal in the C-2 1000 m event at Barcelona in 1992.

Frederiksen moved from Denmark to Norway after the 1996 Summer Olympics in Atlanta.

He found better success at the ICF Canoe Sprint World Championships with eight medals. This includes six golds (C-2 1000 m: 1989, 1993; C-2 10000 m: 1987, 1989, 1990, 1993), one silver (C-2 500 m: 1993), and one bronze (C-2 10000 m: 1986).

References

1965 births
Living people
Danish male canoeists
Canoeists at the 1988 Summer Olympics
Canoeists at the 1992 Summer Olympics
Canoeists at the 1996 Summer Olympics
Canoeists at the 2000 Summer Olympics
Olympic canoeists of Denmark
Olympic silver medalists for Denmark
Norwegian male canoeists
Olympic canoeists of Norway
Danish emigrants to Norway
Olympic medalists in canoeing
ICF Canoe Sprint World Championships medalists in Canadian

Medalists at the 1992 Summer Olympics